Rembau (Jawi: رمباو; Negeri Sembilan Malay: Ghombau; Chinese: 林茂) is a town that is located in Rembau District, Negeri Sembilan, Malaysia. The township is situated about 25 km south from the state capital, Seremban, accessible through Federal Route 1. Most of the population are farmers, traders, government servants, factory workers and most of the young join the army and police force.

Politics
Politically, only two out of four state assembly seats in the parliamentary constituency of Rembau, namely Kota and Chembong. The other two seats, Rantau and Paroi are instead administered by the Seremban City Council.

Gallery

Transportation

Car
Federal Route 1 is the main thoroughfare serving Rembau town. Exit 223 on the North–South Expressway Southern Route serves Rembau.

Public transport
State railway operator KTMB has a station here (code:  KB16 ). It provides KTM Komuter services only.

References

Rembau District
Towns in Negeri Sembilan